The second Langerado Music Festival was held on March 6, 2004, in the heart of downtown Hollywood, FL at the Young Circle Park. In excess of 4,000 people attended this show, which followed in the tradition of the previous year and was a single day event.

Lineup
The artists that attended the festival included Cake, moe., The Wailers, G. Love & Special Sauce, Sound Tribe Sector 9, Cracker, Drive By Truckers, MOFRO, Moshi Moshi, Perpetual Groove, ulu, Brothers Past, Rana, the Spam Allstars, Seth Yacovone Band, Whirlaway, louque, the Yoko Theory and Way of the Groove.

External links
 Winner - City Link Magazine "Best Festival"

Langerado
Langerado Music Festival
Hollywood, Florida
2004 in American music
2004 music festivals
Langerado